Mountain Division is a railroad line that was once owned and operated by the Maine Central Railroad (MEC).

Mountain Division may also refer to:

 1st Mountain Division
 1st Mountain Division (Bundeswehr)
 1st Mountain Division (Wehrmacht)
 2nd Mountain Division
 2nd Mountain Division (Wehrmacht)
 3rd Mountain Division
 3rd Mountain Division (Wehrmacht)
 4th Mountain Division
 4th Mountain Division (India)
 4th Mountain Division (Wehrmacht)
 4 Mountain Infantry Division Livorno (Italian Army)
 5th Mountain Division
 5th Mountain Division (Wehrmacht)
 6th Mountain Division
 6th Mountain Division (Wehrmacht)
 6th SS Mountain Division Nord
 7th Mountain Division
 7th Mountain Division (Wehrmacht)
 7th SS Volunteer Mountain Division Prinz Eugen
 8th Mountain Division
 8th Mountain Division (India)
 8th Mountain Division (Wehrmacht)
 9th Mountain Division
 9th Mountain Division (Wehrmacht)
 10th Mountain Division
 10th Mountain Division Artillery
 4th Brigade Combat Team, 10th Mountain Division
 Combat Aviation Brigade, 10th Mountain Division
 Special Troops Battalion, 10th Mountain Division
 Special Troops Battalion, 1st Brigade Combat Team, 10th Mountain Division (United States)
 Special Troops Battalion, 2nd Brigade Combat Team, 10th Mountain Division (United States)
 Special Troops Battalion, 3rd Brigade Combat Team, 10th Mountain Division (United States)
 13th Waffen Mountain Division of the SS Handschar (1st Croatian)
 21st Waffen Mountain Division of the SS Skanderbeg
 23rd Waffen Mountain Division of the SS Kama (2nd Croatian)
 24th Waffen Mountain Division of the SS Karstjäger
 76th Armenian Mountain Division
 188th Reserve Mountain Division (Wehrmacht)
 Cheyenne Mountain Division
 Mountain Division of the Mountain West Conference

See also
 Mountain (disambiguation) to see other types.
 Central Division (disambiguation)
 Eastern Division (disambiguation)
 Northern Division (disambiguation)
 Southern Division (disambiguation)
 Western Division (disambiguation)